The 1991 Philips Open was a men's tennis tournament played on outdoor clay courts at the Nice Lawn Tennis Club in Nice, France, and was part of the ATP World Series of the 1991 ATP Tour. It was the 20th edition of the tournament and took place from 16 April through 22 April 1991. Unseeded Martín Jaite won the singles title.

Finals

Singles
 Martín Jaite defeated  Goran Prpić 3–6, 7–6(7–1), 6–3
 It was Jaite's 1st singles title of the year and the 12th and last of his career.

Doubles
 Rikard Bergh /  Jan Gunnarsson defeated  Vojtěch Flégl /  Nicklas Utgren 6–4, 4–6, 6–3

References

External links
 ITF tournament edition details

 
Philips Open
1991
Philips Open
Philips Open
20th century in Nice